Saladin the Victorious, also known as Saladin and the Great Crusades, is a 1963 Egyptian epic film directed by Youssef Chahine. It was written by Yusuf Sibai, based on the novel by Naguib Mahfouz. It stars Ahmed Mazhar as Saladin, Salah Zulfikar as Issa El Awam. Nadia Lutfi as Louisa de Lusignan, Omar El-Hariri, Mahmoud El-Meliguy, Leila Fawzi, Hamdi Gheiss, Ahmed Luxor, Hussein Riad, Laila Taher and Zaki Toleimat.

It was entered into the 3rd Moscow International Film Festival. The film was restored to its original running time of 186 minutes from the original negative by the Cineteca di Bologna and was shown at Il Cinema Ritrovato in June 2019. Saladin is one of the Top 100 Egyptian films.

Background
The movie depicts the events of the Third Crusade. What happened during those events is that after Saladin reclaimed Jerusalem, the European powers led by King Richard of England, Emperor Barbarossa of the Holy Roman Empire and King Phillip Augustus of France joined together to reclaim it and return it to Christian hands. This resulted in the war between the Europeans and Saladin, which lasted for three years before a truce was made between Saladin and King Richard, allowing Saladin to keep the land while Christians could freely enter Jerusalem.

When the movie came out, it came at a time when Egypt was free of colonial rule and was released between two wars with Israel. Due to this, the Egyptian government was trying to promote its ideals, with the leader at the time, Gamal Abdel Nasser, being the representative of it. Saladin in many ways references and parallels Nasser as like the president, the movie Saladin pushes forth the ideal of a Pan Arab unity as all Arabs are united in the movie in fighting the European powers, which is no better portrayed then in the line "My dream is to see an Arab Nation under one flag, hearts united and free of hate." This is also portrayed well with Issa, who's a Christian Arab, yet chooses to fight alongside Saladin and his army. Similarly, it also has an anti-colonialism message as the European powers are trying to subjugate the Arab lands under their rule, but they resist and successfully manage to peacefully resolve the war. This is shown in showing the bronze Arabs pulling siege towers at the head of the Crusader army, the Arabs represent those who remain in oppression under imperialistic rule while the mechanical siege towers represent the war-like machines that were present in the battles Egypt fought for their independence.

Production 
The budget was enormous at this time in Egypt, reaching 120,000 L.E. The poster was created by Egyptian artist Mohamed Ragheb.

Plot

The story of Saladin (Ahmed Mazhar) portrays the title character, ruler of the kingdoms surrounding Jerusalem, during the events of the Third Crusade. The film starts with Jerusalem, which is under the authority of the Christians of Europe, having its Muslim pilgrims slaughtered by the Christians in the holy lands. Saladin upon hearing this news seeks the reclamation of the holy lands in a short, almost impossible campaign. He succeeds in taking back Jerusalem, which leads the powers of Europe to organize the Third Crusade with the combined forces of the French king (Omar El-Hariri) and the German emperor under the leadership of Richard the Lionheart of England.  Saladin succeeds in preventing the recapture of Jerusalem, and in the end negotiations between himself and Richard (whom Saladin admires as the only honorable infidel leader) leave the Holy Land in Muslim hands.

The movie also has a subplot involving Christian Issa El Awam (Salah Zulfikar), and the Crusader Louisa (Nadia Lutfi) portraying the title characters. At the beginning, both first meet when Issa accidentally comes upon her when she's taking a bath, and after he turns away waiting for her to get dressed before he takes her prisoner due to being a Crusader, she shoots an arrow at him and escapes. Eventually, after Issa in turns spares her life twice, Louisa chooses to give up her arms as a Crusader and becomes a nurse. This leads to the two falling in love and marrying each other, with Louisa choosing to remain in Jerusalem with him.

Reception 
The film is considered one of the most important Arabic movies of all time, although some viewers took issue with the film's historical inaccuracies. It is also infamous for a production mistake showing a military officer wearing a wristwatch.

Historical Inaccuracies 
Richard I was not shot by a poisoned arrow as depicted in the film but both Richard I and Philippe Augustus II of France were sick from arnaldia, a disease similar to scurvy.

Saladin did not kill the king of France in a duel.

Cast
Ahmed Mazhar as Saladin
Salah Zulfikar as Issa El Awam
Nadia Lutfi as Louisa de Lusignan
Hamdi Geiss as King Richard I (Richard the Lion-Heart)
Leila Fawzi as Virginia, Princess of Kerak
Mahmoud El-Meliguy as Conrad, Marquis of Montferrat
Tewfik El Deken as Prince of Acre
Umar El-Hariri as King Philip of France
Zaki Tulaimat as Duke Arthur
Laila Taher as Queen Berengaria
Ahmed Louxor as Raynald of Châtillon
Fattouh Nchati as Guy of Lusignan
Ibrahim Emara
Mohamed Hamdi
Mohamed Abdel Gawad

See also
Saladin section of legacy in the films and Media.
List of historical drama films
Salah Zulfikar filmography
 List of Islamic films
Battle of Hattin
Third Crusade

References

External links
 

1963 films
1960s historical drama films
1960s biographical drama films
Egyptian biographical drama films
Egyptian historical drama films
Egyptian epic films
Egyptian war drama films
1960s Arabic-language films
Films about Islam
Films based on Egyptian novels
Films based on historical novels
Films based on military novels
Crusades films
Films set in the 12th century
Films directed by Youssef Chahine
Cultural depictions of Saladin
Cultural depictions of Richard I of England
1963 drama films
1960s war drama films
Cultural depictions of Frederick I, Holy Roman Emperor
Films set in Jerusalem